The Notre Dame Victory March is the fight song for the University of Notre Dame.

The chorus of the song has been considered one of the most recognizable collegiate fight songs. It was ranked first among fight songs by Northern Illinois University professor William Studwell and fifth-best on a Sports Illustrated fight song ranking.

Origin
The Notre Dame Victory March was originally created by Michael J. Shea and his brother John F. Shea. Michael wrote the music while John served as the original lyricist. Both of the Shea brothers were alumni at Notre Dame, with Michael graduating in 1905 and John earning degrees there in 1906 and 1908. Michael was an organist at St. Patrick's Cathedral in New York. At the behest of his former music teacher, Professor William C. Hammond of Mount Holyoke College, Michael Shea would first perform the song publicly on the organ of the Second Congregational Church of Holyoke, Massachusetts, where Hammond was music director, soon after completing the composition with his brother in the winter of 1908. 

Many books and other sources have erroneously reported that the song was first performed on Notre Dame's campus on Easter Sunday, 1909, in the rotunda of the Main Building. However, the song made its debut on the Notre Dame campus on December 1, 1908 in Washington Hall at an event honoring the University president, the South Bend Tribune reported on the front page in the next day's issue. "New Notre Dame Song Making Hit, Shea Production Sung First Time at President’s Exercises,” the newspaper headline announced. The tune was sung by the Notre Dame Glee Club, accompanied by the University orchestra. “The song made a decided hit in the hall and at dinner, where it was also given,” The Tribune reported.

Revisions
The lyrics were revised in the 1920s; Notre Dame Victory March first appeared under the copyright of the University of Notre Dame in 1928.

Joseph Casasanta, the University of Notre Dame's Director of Bands from 1923 to 1942, wrote an arrangement of the Victory March which became "the basis for what the Marching Band and Glee Club still perform today." The original composers, John and Michael Shea, believed their composition to be "amateurish" and hoped it would be improved upon. Michael Shea praised Casasanta's arrangement, remarking that "the coming of Mr. Casasanta was evidently the realization of our hopes, and to him I express my hearty appreciation of a good work admirably done for the best University in the land."

The lyrics to the Victory March were modified in June 2022 to mark Notre Dame's 50th anniversary of undergraduate coeducation. The second verse had "daughters" added in recognition of the university's female students:

Original ending lines
When her loyal sons are marching
Onward to victory
Revised ending lines
While her loyal sons and daughters
March on to victory

References

External links
Notre Dame Victory March (hosted by the Internet Archive)

American college songs
College fight songs in the United States
Atlantic Coast Conference fight songs
Notre Dame Fighting Irish
Sydney Swans